Momodou Sarr (born 30 March 2000) is a Finnish professional footballer who plays for Gnistan, as a striker.

Club career
On 21 July 2022, Sarr moved to Gnistan.

References

2000 births
Living people
Finnish footballers
Vaasan Palloseura players
FC Ilves players
IF Gnistan players
Veikkausliiga players
Kakkonen players
Ykkönen players
Association football forwards